Dinevo is a village in the municipality of Haskovo, in Haskovo Province, in southern Bulgaria.

This village, once belonged to the Hasköylü Ağalık, (Agaluk of Haskovo)

References

Villages in Haskovo Province
Romani communities in Bulgaria